Grajal de Campos, Grayal de Campos in Leonese language, is a municipality located in the province of León, Castile and León, Spain. According to the 2010 census (INE), the municipality has a population of 246 inhabitants. There is a historical castle in the town.

See also
Tierra de Campos

References

Municipalities in the Province of León